Silentium is a Finnish gothic metal band. The band was formed in 1995 and it originates from Jämsänkoski, Finland. Keyboardist Sami Boman and original vocalist Matti Aikio created Silentium by adding violin player Jani Laaksonen, guitar players Toni Lahtinen and Juha Lehtioksa and drummer Jari Ojala into the line-up of their previous band Funeral.

Silentium's first demos and EPs were released in tape format, and their albums have only been released in Europe and some Asian countries, although Silentium's last single "Dead Silent" has been uploaded to some legal Finnish music websites for worldwide download.

The addition of singer Riina Rinkinen to the band in 2006 was welcomed by Canadian and German reviewers.

Members

Current members
 Juha Lehtioksa - guitars (1995–present)
 Sami Boman - keyboards, add. brass samples, backing vocals (1995–present)
 Riina Rinkinen - female vocals (2004–present)
 Janne Ojala - drums (1999–2004, 2014–present)
 Aapeli Kivimäki - guitars (2014–present)
 Ville Koskinen - bass (2019–present)

Former Members
 Matti Aikio - bass, male vocals (1995–2018; died 2022)
 Jari Ojala - drums (1995–1999, 2004–2014)
 Toni Lahtinen - guitars (1995–2014)
 Jani Laaksonen - violin (1995–2004)
 Tiina Lehvonen - female vocals (1998–2004)
 Elias Kahila - cello (2005-2007)

Timeline

Discography

Albums and EPs
 Illacrimó (EP, 1996)
 Caméne Misera (EP, 1998)
 Infinita Plango Vulnera (1999)
 SI.VM E.T A.V.VM (2001)
 Altum (2001)
 Sufferion - Hamartia of Prudence (2003)
 Seducia (2006)
 Amortean (2008)
 Motiva (2020)

Singles
 "Frostnight" (2005)
 "Dead Silent" (2007)

See also 
Related genres: 
Gothic metal
Doom metal
Heavy metal
Death metal

References

Finnish heavy metal musical groups
Finnish gothic metal musical groups
Musical groups established in 1995